Synemon nais, the orange sun-moth, is a moth in the Castniidae family. It is found in Australia, including Victoria, South Australia and south-eastern Western Australia.

The wingspan is about 27 mm for males and 30 mm for females. Adults have orange hindwings with a blackish-brown inner section that surrounds an orange spot. Near the outer edges, there is a row of small black spots that are surrounded by orange.

Adults are on wing from mid-October to mid-November.

The larvae probably feed on Austrodanthonia setacea and Austrostipa species.

References

Moths described in 1850
Castniidae
Taxa named by Johann Christoph Friedrich Klug